The Mongol invasion of Central Asia occurred after the unification of the Mongol and Turkic tribes on the Mongolian plateau in 1206. It was finally complete when Genghis Khan conquered the Khwarazmian Empire in 1221.

Qara Khitai (1216-1218)

The Qocho Uyghurs, Qarluqs and local Turkic peoples submitted to the Mongolians.  The Uyghur state of Kara-Khoja was a vassal of the Qara Khitai, but in 1210, the Uyghur ruler of Kara-Khoja, Idiqut Barchuq appeared before the Khan to declare his allegiance to the Mongolians.  He was rewarded with the daughter of Genghis in marriage, and the Uyghurs served under the Mongols as bureaucrats.  A leader of the Qarluq and Buzar, the warlord of Chuy Valley, followed the Uyghur example.

The Qara Khitai (Black Khitan) were Khitans of the Liao Dynasty (907–1125) who were driven out of China by the Jurchens of the Jin dynasty.  In 1124 some Khitans moved westward under Yeh-lü Ta-shih’s leadership and created the Qara Khitai Khanate (Western Liao) between in the Semirechye and the Chu River.  They dominated Central Asia in the 12th century after they defeated the Great Seljuk leader Ahmed Sanjar at the Battle of Qatwan in 1141.  However, their power was shattered in 1211 through the combined actions of the Khwārezm-Shah ʿAlāʾ ad-Dīn Muḥammad (1200–20), and Küchlüg, a fugitive Naiman prince in flight from Genghis Khan’s Mongols. Kuchlug was given shelter by the Qara Khiitai, but he usurped the Gurkhan's throne in 1211.

Kuchlug attacked the city of Almaliq, and the Qarlugs there who were vassals of the Mongols appealed to Genghis Khan for help.  In 1216, Genghis dispatched his general Jebe to pursue Kuchlug. The Mongols defeated the Qara Khitai at Balasaghun, Kuchlug fled, but was later killed in 1218.

Khwarezmia (1219-1221)

The Mongols' original conquest of all "people in felt tents", unifying the nomadic tribes in Mongolia and then the Turcomens and other nomadic peoples, had come with relatively little bloodshed, and almost no material loss. It was not originally the intention of the Mongol Empire to invade the Khwarezmid Empire, and according to Juvaini, Genghis Khan had originally sent the ruler of the Khwarezmid Empire, Sultan Muhammad Aladdin, a message seeking trade and greeted him as his neighbor: "I am master of the lands of the rising sun while you rule those of the setting sun. Let us conclude a firm treaty of friendship and peace." or he said "I am Khan of the lands of the rising sun while you are sultan those of the setting sun: Let us conclude a firm agreement of friendship and peace."

However, the Governor of Otrar refused to receive the mission and had all 450 of them killed, with permission from the Sultan. Upon hearing of this atrocity months later, Genghis Khan flew into a rage and used the incident as a pretext for invasion. The Mongol invasion of Central Asia however would entail the utter destruction of the Khwarezmid Empire along with the massacre of much of the civilian population of the region. According to Juvaini, the Mongols ordered only one round of slaughter in Khwarezm and Transoxiana, but systematically exterminated a particularly large portion of the people of the cities of Khorasan. This earned the Mongols a reputation for bloodthirsty ferocity that would mark the remainder of their campaigns.

During the invasion of Transoxania in 1219, along with the main Mongol force, Genghis Khan used a Chinese specialist catapult unit in battle. They were used again in 1220 in Transoxania. The Chinese may have used the catapults to hurl gunpowder bombs, since they already had them by this time  While Genghis Khan was conquering Transoxania and Persia, several Chinese who were familiar with gunpowder were serving with Genghis's army. Historians have suggested that the Mongol invasion had brought Chinese gunpowder weapons to Central Asia. One of these was the huochong, a Chinese mortar.

References

13th-century conflicts
Central Asia
History of Central Asia
1210s in the Mongol Empire
1220s in the Mongol Empire

lt:Mongolų invazija į Chorezmiją